Calpodes is a genus of skipper butterflies in the family Hesperiidae.

Species
Recognised species in the genus Calpodes include:
Calpodes ethlius (Stoll, [1782]) - Brazilian skipper, larger canna leafroller or canna skipper
Calpodes salius (Cramer, [1775])

References

Natural History Museum Lepidoptera genus database

Hesperiinae
Hesperiidae genera